Martha Kwataine is a Malawian health and human rights activist, and the founder and former executive director of the Malawi Health Equity Network (MHEN).

In October 2006, Kwataine founded the Malawi Health Equity Network (MHEN), and became its executive director. MHEN is an "independent alliance of organizations and individuals promoting equity and quality" in health care, and is based in Lilongwe, the capital of Malawi.

In 2010, a MHEN report showed that the government's health department had spent 50-60% of its budget on activities at its headquarters, rather than on facilities across the country. Kwataine commented, "This is money spent on allowances and four-wheel drive vehicles that race in the streets of the capital, yet 80 percent of Malawians are in the rural areas where health problems are forever acute".

In 2012, Kwataine moved to Washington D.C. in the United States to lobby the US government for help and support.

In 2012 Martha Kwataine was chosen by the former president madam Joyce Banda to come the board chair of Malawi communications Regulatory authority MACRA. At MACRA she remained controversial and continued to question the government as an activist at one point she contradicted Joyce Banda whose government had wanted to rehire the then director general.

In November 2015, Kwataine unexpectedly resigned as executive director of the Malawi Health Equity Network. She is reported to have left MEHN to take up a job with ActionAid.

In 2016 Martha kwataine left action aid to go on to head Baobab Health Trust (BHT). In BHT she worked hand in hand with Malawian hospitals to ensure that the hospitals would have electronic medical records they were doing well till when their biggest donor pulled out.  

In October 2020 Martha Kwataine left BHT as she was appointed by Rev Dr Lazarus Chakwera to be the presidential advisor on Civil Society Organization and from her remarks she seemed to be pro ruling party

References

Living people
Malawian women
Malawian activists
Malawian feminists
Year of birth missing (living people)
Malawian human rights activists
Malawian women's rights activists